Jean Charles Baquoy (1721–1777) was a French engraver.

Baquoy was born and died in Paris.  The eldest son of Maurice Baquoy, he engraved book-plates after the designs of Eisen, Gravelot, Moreau, and others, among which are a set of vignettes for the French translation of Ovid's Metamorphoses, published by Basan, which are executed in a finished style, and a set of plates, after Jean-Baptiste Oudry, for the Fables of La Fontaine. He also  made engravings after Boucher, Watteau, J. Vernet, Wouwerman, and others.

References
 

1721 births
1777 deaths
Artists from Paris
18th-century engravers
French engravers